This list is of Japanese structures dating from the Asuka period (538–710) that have been designated Important Cultural Properties (including *National Treasures). Five surviving sites with six component structures have been so designated, all National Treasures. All are located in the town of Ikaruga in Nara Prefecture, forming part of the UNESCO World Heritage Site Buddhist Monuments in the Hōryū-ji Area.

Structures

See also

 Cultural Properties of Japan
 Japanese Buddhist architecture
 List of Important Cultural Properties of Japan (Nara period: structures)
 Yamada-dera

References

Asuka period
Important Cultural Properties of Japan
Architecture in Japan